Hasan Arat (born 27 September 1959) is a Turkish Sports Administrator, businessman and former professional basketball player. He was the leader of Istanbul's Bid to host the 2020 Olympic and Paralympic Games.

Sports administration
Hasan Arat rose to international prominence as leader of Istanbul's bid to host the 2020 Olympic and Paralympic Games. The Vice-President of the Turkish National Olympic Committee was appointed leader of the Bid when Istanbul were officially shortlisted as a Candidate City by the International Olympic Committee in May 2012. This was Istanbul's fifth and most successful Bid to host the Olympic and Paralympic Games. The announcement of the 2020 Host City was made on 7 September 2013 at the 125th IOC Session in Buenos Aires following presentations by each candidate city, and Istanbul lost to Tokyo in the final round of voting by the International Olympic Committee, following the earlier elimination of Madrid. Arat led Istanbul's final presentation to the International Olympic Committee members  and following Istanbul's presentation, Arat said, "The Bid has united the people of Turkey, especially our young people, behind a common vision for our country’s future. Whatever happens with the vote, this bid has brought the whole nation together; it has inspired and engaged our younger generation; and it has made a lasting connection between Turkey and the Olympic Movement."

Following Arat's leadership of the Istanbul 2020 Bid, he was elected as an Executive Committee member of the European Olympic Committee, and appointed a member of the International Olympic Committee's Marketing Commission, as well as the Association of National Olympic Committees (ANOC) Marketing and New Sources of Finance Commission. In May 2014, IOC President, Thomas Bach, announced that Arat would be one of nine members of a new Olympic Bidding Procedure Working Group, which aimed to review the bidding procedure to host an Olympic Games in order to make it simpler and more appealing for cities to apply. On 25 July 2019, it was announced that Arat would be the Chair of the EOC Coordination Commission for the 2023 European Games due to take place in Krakow and the Malopolska region of Poland. Arat joined the Executive Board of the World Athletics Council on 24 November 2019. Arat is the Chairman of the Board of BIDEV (Basketball Solidarity and Education Foundation), a non-profit organization with the aim of contributing to the development of Turkish basketball. On 4th August 2022, the NBA and BIDEV announced a multiyear collaboration to launch the Jr. NBA Turkey League, a youth basketball league for boys and girls ages 11-14 from 30 participating primary schools in Istanbul. On 10th January 2023, Arat was awarded a "Golden Mongoose" Special Medal of Honour 'for the outstanding contribution to the fortification of the international relations and friendship among nations as one of the best traditions of sport'

Basketball career
Hasan Arat played professional basketball for 7 years. After beginning his career at Adana Demirspor, he played for 5 years for Besiktas Gymnastics Club (BJK) from 1977 -1981. He was the Vice-President of Besiktas Gymnastics Club (BJK) from 1998-2000.

Business career
Arat is the Partner and Chairman of Novo Invest, a multifaceted real estate investment and development company, the Founder and Partner of Dome Group, an independent Corporate Finance and M&A advisory firm based in London and Istanbul, and the Vice Chairman of Turkey's biggest retail group Beymen.

Arat holds a variety of other business positions, including membership of the Board of Trustees of Özyeğin University, Board member of FIBA Holding, Vice President of the United Nations World Tourism Organization's (UNTWO) Affiliated Members Board of Directors, representing the Union of Chambers and Commodity Exchanges of Turkey (TOBB), and former President and current member of the Executive Council and Board of Directors of the International Apparel Federation (IAF)

Arat was awarded the ‘Businessman of the Year’ award in 1996 by Economist Magazine, the National Productivity Center of Turkey and Dunya Newspaper.

Personal life
He lives in Istanbul with his wife, Simin, and has a son, Ali, and a daughter, Zeynep.

References

Turkish men's basketball players
Living people
1959 births